Dessoir is a surname. Notable people with the surname include:

 Ferdinand Dessoir (1836–1892), German actor
 Ludwig Dessoir (1810–1874), German actor
 Max Dessoir (1867–1947), German philosopher and theorist of aesthetics
Susanne Dessoir (1859–1953), German operatic singer

See also
 Dessau (disambiguation)
 Dessauer